West Surrey (formally the Western division of Surrey) was a parliamentary constituency in the county of Surrey, which returned two Members of Parliament (MPs) to the House of Commons of the Parliament of the United Kingdom, elected by the bloc vote system.

It was created under the Great Reform Act for the 1832 general election, and abolished for the 1885 general election.

Boundaries
1832–1885: The Hundreds of Blackheath, Copthorne, Effingham, Elmbridge, Farnham, Godalming, Godley and Chertsey, Woking and Wotton.

The constituency was therefore the more extensive and more rural of the two divisions of Surrey established in 1832.  Its main existing towns were urbanising with railway stations built; Woking became a town towards the end of its existence.  Elections were conducted at Guildford; other most populous towns were Leatherhead, Dorking, Epsom, Ewell, Farnham, Godalming, Haslemere, Chertsey, Egham, Walton-on-Thames, Weybridge and Woking. Guildford was a parliamentary borough represented in its own right, but those of its freeholders not qualifying for a vote as such could vote for the county division MPs.

Subdivision in 1885

On its abolition in 1885 its contents made up all or some of four single-member seats and the overlapping seat (1295-1867 a constituency returning two members), Guildford parliamentary borough, was abolished. The outcome was as follows:
The North-Western division of Surrey or Chertsey (i.e. Bisley; Byfleet; Chertsey; Chobham; Egham; Horsell; Pyrford; Thorpe; Weybridge; Windlesham; Ash, East Clandon, West Clandon, East Horsley, West Horsley, Merrow, Ockham, Pirbright, Send and Ripley, Wanborough, Windlesham, Wisley, Woking and Worplesdon.)
Epsom (UK Parliament constituency) drew on Mid Surrey as to Tolworth, New Malden, Malden, Worcester Park, Surbiton, Hook, Coombe and Long Ditton in the Kingston Hundred and Sessional Division. Took: Ashtead; Banstead; Great Bookham; Little Bookham; Cheam; Chessington; Cuddington; Epsom; Ewell; Fetcham; Headley; Leatherhead; Sutton; Walton on the Hill; Cobham; Thames Ditton; Esher; East Molesey; West Molesey; Stoke D'Abernon; and Walton on Thames.
Reigate (UK Parliament constituency) drew, approximately equally, on Mid and East Surrey. Took: Abinger; Capel; Dorking; Dorking Rural (reached South Holmwood); Newdigate; Ockley; Wotton.
The South-Western division of Surrey or Guildford as to the rest

Members of Parliament

The Times obituary of Leech reads:

Election results

Elections in the 1830s

Elections in the 1840s
Perceval (of the with-heirs-male inheritee branch of the Earls of Egmont) was in 1802 given his peerage becoming Lord Arden which caused a by-election.

Denison's death caused a by-election.

Elections in the 1850s

Elections in the 1860s
Drummond's death caused a by-election.

Elections in the 1870s
Briscoe's death caused a by-election.

Elections in the 1880s

References 

F W S Craig, British Parliamentary Election Results 1832-1885 (2nd edition, Aldershot: Parliamentary Research Services, 1989)
 Frederic A Youngs, jr, Guide to the Local Administrative Units of England, Vol II (London: Royal Historical Society, 1991)

Politics of Surrey
History of Surrey
Parliamentary constituencies in South East England (historic)
Constituencies of the Parliament of the United Kingdom established in 1832
Constituencies of the Parliament of the United Kingdom disestablished in 1885